Endangered is a 2022 documentary film directed by Rachel Grady and Heidi Ewing. It details threats against journalists in the United States and around the world.

Reception

References

External links 
  
 

2022 documentary films
Documentary films about journalists